"No New Friends" is a hip hop and trap song by American musician DJ Khaled, released as the lead single from his seventh studio album, Suffering from Success. The song features rappers Drake, Rick Ross and Lil Wayne, and features production from Robert Bullock, Boi-1da, Vinylz, and Noah "40" Shebib. The song was released for digital download in the United States on April 19, 2013. The song has peaked at number 37 on the US Billboard Hot 100, making it his sixth top 40 single on that chart.

Background 
The song was first announced by Drake on April 12, 2013, during an interview with Elliott Wilson on his EVR radio show. On April 14, 2013, DJ Khaled released a promotional video titled "No New Friends" The Movie. The song was premiered by Funkmaster Flex on April 15, 2013. The song, produced by Robert Bullock, Boi-1da, Noah "40" Shebib and Vinylz, features Drake, Rick Ross and Lil Wayne, the same rappers from Khaled's most successful hit "I'm on One". The lineup was originally the official remix to Drake's single "Started from the Bottom", but Drake decided to give the song to Khaled. The song had an earlier version that featured an outro by Atlanta rapper Future, but his vocals were taken out for unknown reasons.

Music video 
The song's music video was shot on May 15 and 16, 2013 in Miami, Florida. The video features cameos by Ace Hood and Birdman among others. The music video was co-directed by Colin Tilley and Drake. It premiered on MTV Jams on June 9, 2013.

Charts

Weekly charts

Year-end charts

Certifications

Radio and release history

References

2013 singles
Cash Money Records singles
DJ Khaled songs
Drake (musician) songs
Rick Ross songs
Lil Wayne songs
Songs written by Drake (musician)
Songs written by Rick Ross
Songs written by Lil Wayne
Song recordings produced by Boi-1da
Song recordings produced by 40 (record producer)
Music videos directed by Colin Tilley
Songs written by 40 (record producer)
Song recordings produced by Vinylz
2013 songs
Songs written by Vinylz
Songs written by DJ Khaled
Song recordings produced by Allen Ritter